The 1995 Pontiac Excitement 400 was the third stock car race of the 1995 NASCAR Winston Cup Series and the 41st iteration of the event. The race was held on Sunday, March 5, 1995, in Richmond, Virginia, at Richmond International Raceway, a 0.75 miles (1.21 km) D-shaped oval. The race took the scheduled 400 laps to complete. At race's end, Hendrick Motorsports driver Terry Labonte would manage to dominate the final stages of the race to take his 15th career NASCAR Winston Cup Series victory and his first victory of the season. To fill out the top three, Richard Childress Racing driver Dale Earnhardt and Penske Racing South driver Rusty Wallace would finish second and third, respectively.

Background 

Richmond International Raceway (RIR) is a 3/4-mile (1.2 km), D-shaped, asphalt race track located just outside Richmond, Virginia in Henrico County. It hosts the Monster Energy NASCAR Cup Series and Xfinity Series. Known as "America's premier short track", it formerly hosted a NASCAR Camping World Truck Series race, an IndyCar Series race, and two USAC sprint car races.

Entry list 

 (R) denotes rookie driver.

Qualifying 
Qualifying was originally scheduled to be split into two rounds. The first round was scheduled to be held on Friday, March 3, at 10:30 AM EST. However, qualifying was snowed out and postponed until Saturday, March 4, at 12:00 PM EST. Qualifying was eventually combined into only one round. Each driver would have one lap to set a time. For this specific race, positions 1-34 would be decided on time, and depending on who needed it, a select amount of positions were given to cars who had not otherwise qualified but were high enough in owner's points; which is usually four.

Nine drivers would fail to qualify: Jimmy Hensley, Kenny Wallace, Billy Standridge, Jay Hedgecock, Steve Grissom, Gary Bradberry, Ben Hess, Eric Smith, and Davy Jones.

Full qualifying results

Race results

References 

1995 NASCAR Winston Cup Series
NASCAR races at Richmond Raceway
March 1995 sports events in the United States
1995 in sports in Virginia